Donal Vaughan is a Gaelic footballer who played inter county football with Mayo. He plays club football for Castlebar Mitchels since 2017 after leaving Ballinrobe.

Playing career
Vaughan started at centre back in two All-Ireland SFC finals: the 2012 decider, which Mayo lost by 0-13 to 2-11 against Donegal and the 2013 decider, which Mayo lost by 1-14 to 2-12 against.

He was sent off in the 2017 All-Ireland Senior Football Championship Final after a reckless charge at John Small of Dublin after a free was awarded and Small was shown his second yellow of the match. Dublin would go on to win afterwards. Many Mayo fans blamed Vaughan's sending off as the main reason why Mayo lost the final.

A player often highly praised and admired in GAA circles, particularly outside his own county. Vaughan has been credited as an important influence in many of Mayo's more notable victories. While the appreciation of his style of play appeared to divide many within the Mayo GAA fan base, Vaughan has featured heavily in the latter stages of inter-county championship football in Mayo's finals era.

In December 2017, Vaughan moved from his home club Ballinrobe to rivals Castlebar Mitchels, a town where he lived and worked, following Ballinrobe's relegation to the Intermediate ranks, which caused much controversy. Vaughan has struggled for game time since the move.
He announced his retirement from the inter-county game in January 2021.

Personal life
Vaughan owns his own shoe shop chain in his home county, which is named Vaughan Shoes.

References

External links
GAA.ie Interview 2012

Year of birth missing (living people)
Living people
Ballinrobe Gaelic footballers
Castlebar Mitchels Gaelic footballers
Gaelic football backs
Mayo inter-county Gaelic footballers
Shoeshiners